Smock is an unincorporated community and census-designated place in Franklin and Menallen townships in Fayette County, Pennsylvania, United States. It is located roughly halfway between the borough of Perryopolis and the city of Uniontown, and is part of the Pittsburgh metropolitan area. As of the 2010 census, the population was 583.

Geography

The community is located along Redstone Creek, which forms the boundary between Franklin and Menallen townships. Pennsylvania Route 51, a four-lane highway, forms the eastern edge of the CDP. Route 51 leads north  to Perryopolis and south  to Uniontown, the county seat.

The community has the name of Samuel Smock, the original owner of the town site.

Notable person

 James Warhola, artist

References

External links

Census-designated places in Fayette County, Pennsylvania
Census-designated places in Pennsylvania